The 1903 Haskell Indians football team was an American football team that represented the Haskell Indian Institute (now known as Haskell Indian Nations University) as an independent during the 1902 college football season. In its first season under head coach Albert E. Herrnstein, Haskell compiled a 7–2 record and outscored opponents by a total of 131 to 50.

Schedule

References

Haskell
Haskell Indian Nations Fighting Indians football seasons
Haskell Indians football